No More Cocoons is the first spoken word album by Jello Biafra.

Track listing
Disc 1

Disc 2

References

1987 debut albums
Alternative Tentacles albums
Jello Biafra albums
Spoken word albums by American artists